The men's 4 x 100 metres relay at the 2006 European Athletics Championships were held at the Ullevi on August 12 and August 13.

Medalists

Schedule

Results

Heats
First 3 in each heat (Q) and the next 2 fastest (q) advance to the Final.

Final

External links
Results

Relay 4 x 100
Relays at the European Athletics Championships